Rico Rodriguez II (born July 31, 1998) is an American actor. He is best known for his role as Manny Delgado on the ABC sitcom Modern Family, which ran for eleven seasons from 2009 to 2020. He received several Screen Actors Guild Awards for his performance. He has also appeared in numerous other television shows and movies, both as himself and other characters, before, during, and after the show's run, such as Epic Movie, Endgame, El Americano: The Movie, and Nickelodeon's The Substitute and Unfiltered.

Early life
Rico Rodriguez II was born in Bryan, Texas, the son of Diane and Roy Rodriguez, who owned Rodriguez Tire Service. His siblings are brothers Ray and Roy Jr., and sister Raini Rodriguez, who is an actress. He is of Mexican descent.

Career

At age nine, he played a character, also named Rico, in Cory in the House. He later had guest appearances on the series 'Til Death, ER, iCarly, and My Name is Earl.

In 2007, he appeared in the comedy film Epic Movie as the character Chanchito. The movie earned a score of 2% on Rotten Tomatoes, from 66 reviews. Jamie Russell of BBC referred to it as "the most excruciating, unfunny film you'll see this year...if not your entire lifetime".

In September 2009, he began playing Manny Delgado in Modern Family. His role was said to be "crazy hard" to cast by co-creator Steve Levitan. In 2010, he said he is sometimes nothing like Manny, although he also named some similarities between them. Later, in 2016, Rodriguez said he had "grown into the character", finding more in common with him. For the role, he was nominated eight times, along with the rest of the cast of Modern Family, for the Screen Actors Guild Awards, winning four of them.

The same year Modern Family was released, he also appeared in a season six episode of NCIS as Travis, a boy who discovers a gun and dead body.

He wrote a book that was published in November 2012, titled Reel Life Lessons... So Far. Among other things, he discusses what it was like having Sofía Vergara as his character's mother on Modern Family, writing that she treats him like he were her own son.

In 2015, Rodriguez played the character of Jose in Endgame, a coming-of-age film about a Mexican middle-schooler who joins a chess team. It received a score of 50% on Rotten Tomatoes, based on eight reviews.

Rodriguez later voiced a character named Raha in The Lion Guard, part of The Lion King franchise, which ran from 2016 to 2019. The show's cast also included Modern Family co-star Sarah Hyland.

In 2016, Rodriguez played a parrot named Cuco in the animated film El Americano: The Movie. Its director, Ricardo Arnaiz, was very pleased with the casting.

Modern Family ended after eleven seasons in April 2020. He announced on Instagram that "words cannot even begin to describe the life-changing experience I have had on this show". Since then, he has made appearances as himself on The Substitute and Unfiltered, both on Nickelodeon.

Personal life
Rodriguez is a Houston Rockets fan. He has described himself as an avid reader.

On March 12, 2017, Rodriguez's father, Roy, died at age 52.

Filmography

Film

Television

Awards and nominations

References

External links

 

1998 births
Living people
21st-century American male actors
American male actors of Mexican descent
American male child actors
American male film actors
American male television actors
American male voice actors
Male actors from Texas
People from College Station, Texas